Charles Mordaunt may refer to:

Charles Mordaunt, 3rd Earl of Peterborough and 1st Earl of Monmouth, English soldier
Charles Mordaunt, 4th Earl of Peterborough and 2nd Earl of Monmouth
Sir Charles Mordaunt, 6th Baronet, MP Warwickshire
Sir Charles Mordaunt, 8th Baronet, MP Warwickshire
Sir Charles Mordaunt, 10th Baronet, MP South Warwickshire